Bożena Kurowska (21 August 1937 – 16 September 1969) was a Polish actress. She appeared in five films between 1959 and 1966.

Selected filmography
 Lotna (1959)
 Na białym szlaku (1962)

References

External links

1937 births
1969 deaths
Polish film actresses
People from Łuków
Polish stage actresses
Burials at Bródno Cemetery
Aleksander Zelwerowicz National Academy of Dramatic Art in Warsaw alumni